Nebria navajo is a species of ground beetle in the Nebriinae subfamily that can be found in such US states as Alaska and Colorado.

References

navajo
Beetles described in 1979
Beetles of North America
Endemic fauna of the United States